A Beautiful Stranger is the English title of the Polish film Piękna nieznajoma directed by Jerzy Hoffman, released in 1992.

Synopsis
In 1916 a young Russian officer is asked to transport important documents by train. Several factions pursue the papers.

External links
 

1992 films
Films directed by Jerzy Hoffman
Polish drama films